Ujjaini Mukherjee is an Indian singer.

Early years 

At age 10, Ujjaini received her first award from Vijay Kichlu and it was during her early teens that she decided to become a playback singer and performer. Her first recording was for the brilliant composer Debojyoti Mishra.

At the age of 16 she participated in the Sa Re Ga Ma Pa Challenge 2005 and finished in the final top 10.

This piece of success was immediately followed by a bigger one, Sa Re Ga Ma Pa Ek Main Aur Ek Tu, where Ujjaini grabbed the winning trophy along with Aishwarya Nigam. Since then there has been no looking back for her as almost all the film industries in the country approached her and as a result, Ujjaini has sung in many languages like Hindi, Bengali, English, Bhojpuri, Marathi, Kannada, Telugu, Assamese, Odia.

Independent Singles 

Some of Ujjaini's own singles available on YouTube are "Aay Srabon" 2013 "Saajan Gaye Pardes" 2014 and "Nishi Raat Baanka Chand" 2016, a huge recent hit which she released to pay her tribute to the legendary singer Geeta Dutt on her 86th birth anniversary. Out of these, "Saajan Gaye Pardes" remains one of the best work by Ujjaini as she herself wrote, composed and sang the song.

Awards And Nominations 

She was nominated for the Mirchi Music Awards in the 'Upcoming Female singer' Category for the song "Mannu Bhaiyya Ka Karihen" from the film Tanu Weds Manu.

She was also nominated for Filmfare Awards East for "Ami Akash khola" from the film Aborto (2014) and was the winner of the "Kalakar Awards 2015" as the "Best Female Performer".

Nominated for "Best Female Vocalist of the Year – Films" for her hugely popular song "Dil Rasiya" from Byomkesh Pawrbo in the 2017 edition of Mirchi Music Awards Bangla

Nominated at the Mirchi Music Awards for Upcoming Female Vocalist of The Year in 2011 for her song "Mannu Bhaiyya" from Tanu Weds Manu

Nominated as best female playback singer at the first Filmfare Awards East for Aborto

Ujjaini was nominated for "Best Female Vocalist of the Year – Films" for her hugely popular song "Dil Rasiya" from Byomkesh Pawrbo in the 2017 edition of Mirchi Music Awards Bangla

At the 2018 Mirchi Music Awards Bangla Ujjaini's Durga Puja special album in 2017 "Muhurto" (Moments) garnered nominations for Song of the Year, Music Composer of the Year, Lyricist of the Year in the "Adhunik" (Modern) categories and also, Ujjaini's film song from Ebong Kiriti earned her a nomination for the best Female Vocalist of the Year.

Achievements 

She was a finalist on Sa Re Ga Ma Pa Challenge 2005 achieving 7th place and within the span of a few months in 2006, she was the grand finale winner of Sa Re Ga Ma Pa Ek Main Aur Ek Tu with Aishwarya.

Ujjaini also participated in some other popular reality shows as well, like Indian Idol (2004), Jo Jeeta Wohi Super Star (2008), Music ka Maha Muqqabla (2010).

Winner of the "Kalakar Awards 2015" as "Best Female Performer" and also, the "Kolkata Ratna" Award, The Bengal Youth Icon award as the best performer

She has performed in numerous shows in India and around the world.

Ujjaini performed at the prestigious London Wembley Arena with Himesh Reshammiya in the year 2006.

Discography

Film Songs
Following are the list of songs that Ujjaini Mukherjee has sung for various Indian Movies

Non-film Songs

Out of all the songs that Ujjaini has sung, a special mention goes to "Devotee" , the track from the album "Maya (A Tribute To Ravi Shankar)" an internationally acclaimed album by the legendary Bickram Ghosh. Another mention goes for the Durga Puja special album "Bondhu... Thakish Pashe" in 2016 which was initiated by Geet Entertainment by bringing together Ujjaini and Rupankar Bagchi, the best names in Bengali music to recreate the magic of the old times in a new age as the songs of the album had a beautiful melodious feel of the old times to them and also, it was another attempt to relive the time without digital piracy and promote original music by releasing it only on physically available CDs. In 2017, Ujjaini collaborated with Ashu Abhishek , the new age composer duo for her Durga Puja special album "Muhurto" and it had a fully digital release under the label of Asha Audio. Ujjaini has sung numerous Non Film songs including title tracks for TV serials, a few of them have been assembled below :-

Television
Before becoming one of the leading names in playback singing in the film industry, Ujjaini proved her mettle in singing on national television through below mentioned reality shows :-

She is also a regular celebrity guest performer on TV shows like Didi no 1 and Rannaghar amongst many others.

References

External links 

Year of birth missing (living people)
Living people
Indian women playback singers
Sa Re Ga Ma Pa participants
Women musicians from West Bengal
Singers from Kolkata
21st-century Indian women singers
21st-century Indian singers